Alonso de Alvarado Montaya González de Cevallos y Miranda (1500–1556) was a Spanish conquistador and knight of the Order of Santiago.

He was born at Secadura de Trasmiera.  After a period in Mexico under the orders of Hernán Cortés, he joined the campaign of Francisco Pizarro.

He went to Peru with his uncle Pedro de Alvarado in search of gold in 1534. There he fought against the armies of Manco Inca Yupanqui that were besieging Lima in 1536, against Diego de Almagro in 1537 and at the Battle of Las Salinas in 1538. He later fought at Chupas and Jaquijahuana.

While charged by some contemporaries with avarice and cruelty, it is undeniable that during the period of civil wars in Peru (about 1537 to 1555) Alvarado was an unflinching and determined adherent to the interests of the Spanish crown. He always sided with those whom he thought to be sincere representatives of the crown, and it was not always profitable and safe to be on that side.

Thus in 1537, he commanded the troops of Pizarro's followers, when Diego de Almagro claimed the mythical Inca city of Cuzco. He was defeated and captured by the latter at the Battle of Abancay.  Effecting his escape under great difficulties as well as dangers, and rejoining Pizarro, whom he looked upon as the legitimate governor of Peru, he took part in all the bloody troubles that followed, always as a prominent military leader and always unsuccessful when in immediate command. Still, he was counted upon as a mainstay of the Spanish cause, and occupied a high military position.

Alvarado married in Spain while on a short visit, in 1544.

When Francisco Hernández Girón initiated a rebellion in 1553, Alvarado was put in command of the forces to oppose him. At Chuquinga, in 1554, Alvarado suffered a signal defeat at the hands of the insurgents. Overcome by melancholy in consequence of that last disaster, he pined away and died. His principal achievement was the pacification of Chachapoyas in northeastern Peru, in the years 1535 and 1536, this being the first step taken from Peru towards the Amazonian basin.

Search for El Dorado
Alonso de Alvarado was the precursor of the expeditions that penetrated the Amazon Basin: he departed from Trujillo, Peru and, crossing the Andes, came in 1535 to the land of the Chachapoyas, where a few years later the city that today is the capital of the department of Amazonas was founded.

The account of the chronicler Pedro Cieza of León mentions the first foundation of the city of Chachapoyas:

On the fifth of September in the year of the Lord one thousand five hundred and thirty eight Ihsu Christo, with sixty Spaniards under the control of captain Alonso de Alvarado arrived in [...] " Xalca " and made the first foundation of Chachapoyas.

Also present at the foundation was Captain Luis Valera, father of the Cachapoyana Jesuit Blas Valera, of whose chronicles the Inca Garcilaso de la Vega nourished for the description of the Tawantinsuyo in his "Real Comments of the Incas".

In Chachapoyas, Alvarado had knowledge of the fabulous treasures that a legendary city was keeping in the thickness of the forest, the mythical "El Dorado" and from there he organized new expeditions along the Marañón River, founding also the city of Moyobamba in 1540.

Civil Wars in Peru 
Alvarado also took part in the civil wars that faced Diego de Almagro and Francisco Pizarro. He was made a prisoner by Almagro in 1537 but he managed to escape. Later with the  followers of Pizarro and in support of his allegiance to the king, Alvarado defeated the followers of Almagro in the Battle of Las Salinas in 1538.

On the order of Francisco Pizarro, he looked in 1539 for the ideal place for the foundation of a city halfway between Lima and Cusco. Thus, along with Francisco de Cárdenas, he took part in the foundation of Huamanga.

Avenging the death of his father, Diego de Almagro II, "El Mozo" (The Lad), killed Francisco Pizarro in 1541. In the following year, the governor Cristóbal Vaca de Castro, allied to the Alonso de Alvarado, defeated "El Mozo" in the battle of Chupas. The loyalty and the merits of Alvarado were honored by Carlos I of Spain who he named a member of the Order of Santiago and Marshall of Peru, when he returned to Spain and married.

Alvarado returned to Peru in 1546.  In April 1548, Alvarado had to prove again the allegiance to the Crown fighting against the rebellious younger brother of Pizarro, Gonzalo. Under the control of Pedro de la Gasca, he ensured victory in the battle of Jaquijahuana, but this victory did not calm the many discontented Spanish settlers opposed to the increasing control of the envoys of the Spanish court.  In 1553, as captain-general and chief justice in La Plata and Potosí, he put down a rebellion by Sebastian de Castilla.  In 1554, Alvarado confronted the rebel forces led by Francisco Hernández Girón and was defeated in the Battle of Chuquinga.  Alvarado died in Lima in 1556.

Chachapoyas was, from his foundation, a city - port of that numerous expeditions that left for the forest. The legend of "El Dorado" inspired the thirst for wealth of the first Spanish explorers. Although the enthusiasm for the tasty reward was commanding his sleep, his companies met frustadas for unsuspected enemies: the famine, the illnesses, the Indians and the forest itself.

"El Dorado" described from the imaginary one of the conqueror, is a city which streets and temples are covered of gold and he keeps, in his constructions and squares, made pieces of massive gold. Sometimes he was looked to the north, from Chachapoyas; others, from Quillabamba; in other occasions, some more recent explorers located his track (that later they "lost") in the central forest and inclusive in Colombia. Nevertheless, this golden legend opened the doors for the initial colonization and evangelization of some of the most extensive and remote regions of South America.

References

Sources 
 Taken from es.wikipedia.org Alonso de Alvarado

1500 births
1556 deaths
People from Trasmiera
Spanish conquistadors
Cantabrian conquistadors
Spanish generals
16th-century Spanish people
Colonial Peru
Knights of Santiago
16th-century Peruvian people